James Edward Green (born  in Ipswich, Suffolk) was an English cricketer who played for Suffolk.

Green made a single List A appearance for the team, during the 1966 season, having played in the Minor Counties Championship in 1963 and 1965. Green scored 13 not out in his only List A innings.

References

1943 births
Living people
Cricketers from Ipswich
English cricketers
Suffolk cricketers